Jonathan Mridha (born 8 April 1995) is a Swedish tennis player of Bangladeshi descent.

Mridha has a career high ATP singles ranking of 444, achieved on 7 March 2022. He also has a career high ATP doubles ranking of 508 achieved on 9 May 2016.

Career
Mridha made his ATP main draw doubles debut at the 2015 Swedish Open partnering Fred Simonsson where they reached the quarterfinals.

National Representation
Mridha represents Sweden at the Davis Cup, where he has a W/L record of 1–1. He made his debut at the 2018 Davis Cup World Group Play-offs against Switzerland. In his first match he lost against Henri Laaksonen. Two days later he played the decider match against Sandro Ehrat and won the match in four sets.

Challenger and ITF Futures/World Tennis Tour finals

Singles: 5 (4–1)

Doubles 7 (5–2)

Davis Cup

Participations: (1–1)

   indicates the outcome of the Davis Cup match followed by the score, date, place of event, the zonal classification and its phase, and the court surface.

See also
List of Sweden Davis Cup team representatives

References

External links
 
 
 

1995 births
Living people
Swedish male tennis players
Tennis players from Stockholm
Swedish people of Bangladeshi descent